The Leader of the Opposition leads the Official Opposition in the Jatiya Sangsad, the national parliament of Bangladesh. The Leader of the Opposition is the leader of the largest political party in the Jatiya Sangsad that is not in government. That is usually the leader of the second largest political party in the Jatiya Sangsad.

The post also carries the weight of a cabinet minister and is seen as comparable to that of the Prime Minister, who is the leader of the house and of their political party.

List of leaders of the opposition in Jatiya Sangsad 
There was no opposition leader in the 1st and the 6th Parliament.

References

 
Lists of political office-holders in Bangladesh
Bangladesh